Aid to Families with Dependent Children (AFDC) was a federal assistance program in the United States in effect from 1935 to 1997, created by the Social Security Act (SSA) and administered by the United States Department of Health and Human Services that provided financial assistance to children whose families had low or no income.

The program grew from a minor part of the social security system to a significant system of welfare administered by the states with federal funding. However, it was criticized for offering incentives for women to have children, and for providing disincentives for women to join the workforce. In July 1997, AFDC was replaced by the more restrictive Temporary Assistance for Needy Families (TANF) program.

History

The program was created under the name Aid to Dependent Children (ADC) by the Social Security Act of 1935 as part of the New Deal. It was created as a means tested entitlement which subsidized the income of families where fathers were "deceased, absent, or unable to work". It provided a direct payment of $18 per month for one child, and $12 for a second child. In 1994, the average payment was $420/month.

The federal government required contributions from individual states, and authorized state discretion to determine who received aid and in what amount.In 1961 a change in the law permitted states to extend benefits to families where the father was unemployed, a measure which 25 states eventually adopted. The words "families with" were added to the name in 1962, partly due to concern that the program's rules discouraged marriage.

The Civil Rights Movement and the efforts of the National Welfare Rights Organization in the 1960s expanded the scope of welfare entitlements to include black women. The welfare rolls racial demographics changed drastically. The majority of welfare recipients still remained white and most black female recipients continued to work. Starting in 1962, the Department of Health and Human Services allowed state-specific exemptions as long as the change was "in the spirit of AFDC" in order to allow some experimentation. By 1996 spending was $24 billion per year. When adjusted for inflation, the highest spending was in 1976, which exceeded 1996 spending by about 8%. In 1967 the federal government began requiring states to establish the paternity of children eligible for the program, and extended benefits to "unemployed male parents with a work history".

Man-in-the-house rule
A number of states enacted so called "man-in-the-house" rules, which disqualified families if there was any adult male present in the household whatsoever. This was part of a broader attempt to discourage welfare dependency by the undeserving, in particular black families where the man didn't have work or where the woman had a relationship with men who didn't take care of the family. 

The "man-in-the-house" rule was struck down in 1968 by the Supreme Court in King v. Smith. Thereafter, families with males in the household were eligible for benefits if they were not deemed to be actual or substitute parents, although any financial contribution on the part of the male to the family was still considered a part of the family's total income. By 1981, the Supreme Court went further and required that states take into consideration the income earned by step-fathers.

Thirty-and-a-third rule

The year 1967 saw the establishment of the thirty-and-a-third rule, which allowed families to keep their first $30 earned along with one third of their income following the first $30 without the change affecting their eligibility for benefits. This and other factors led to a large increase in enrollment. For example, caseloads rose 24% from 1960 to 1965, but rose 126% in the period from 1965 to 1970.

Criticism

Early in the program, there were concerns about whether it encouraged unwed motherhood. Some advocates complained that the rule had the effect of breaking up marriages and promoting matriarchy:

[T]he AFDC program tended to treat households with a cohabiting male who was not the natural father of the children much more leniently than those with a resident spouse or father of the children. This feature created a clear disincentive for marriage and also a clear incentive for divorce, because women who married face the reduction or loss of their AFDC benefits.

In 1984, libertarian author Charles Murray, author of The Bell Curve, suggested that welfare causes dependency. He argued that as welfare benefits increased, the number of recipients also increased; this behavior, he said, was rational: there is little reason to work if one can receive benefits for a long period of time without having to work. His later work and that of Richard J. Herrnstein and others suggested possible merit to the theory of a dysgenic effect, however, the data are not entirely clear.

One economist was unable to find convincing evidence that welfare programs have a strong effect on the dissolution of marriages.  But right or wrong, this argument was among the stepping stones leading to the modification of AFDC toward TANF.

Termination
In 1996, President Bill Clinton negotiated with the Republican-controlled Congress to pass the Personal Responsibility and Work Opportunity Act, which drastically restructured the program. Among other changes, a lifetime limit of five years was imposed on the receipt of benefits; the newly limited nature of the replacement program was reinforced by calling AFDC's successor Temporary Assistance for Needy Families (TANF). Many Americans continue to refer to TANF as "welfare" or AFDC.

TANF has remained controversial. In 2003, LaShawn Y. Warren, an ACLU Legislative Counsel, said that TANF gives states an incentive "to deny benefits to those who need it most. The solution to getting people out of the cycle of poverty is not to prematurely kick them off welfare. Too many have been denied aid unfairly, creating a false impression that the number of people who need help has decreased." In 2006, a New Republic editorial wrote, "A broad consensus now holds that welfare reform was certainly not a disaster—and that it may, in fact, have worked much as its designers had hoped."

See also
Administration for Children and Families
Goldberg v. Kelly
Universal basic income

Notes

References

Further reading

 Keith M. Kilty, Elizabeth A. Segal. The Promise of Welfare Reform: Political Rhetoric and the Reality of Poverty in the Twenty-First. (2006)
 Clarita A. Mrena and Patricia Elston. Welfare Reform: State Sanction Policies and Number of Families Affected (2000)
 Robert P Stoker and Laura A Wilson. When Work Is Not Enough: State and Federal Policies to Support Needy Workers 2006
 Webster G. Tarpley and Anton Chaitkin. George Bush: The Unauthorized Biography
 Joel N. Shurkin. Broken Genius: The Rise and Fall of William Shockley, Creator of the Electronic Age. New York: Palgrave Macmillan. 2006. 
 Herrnstein, R. J. and Murray, C. (1994). The Bell Curve: Intelligence and Class Structure in American Life. New York: Free Press. 
 Charles Murray, 1984. Losing Ground: American Social Policy. 1950–1980
 Nick Gillespie. "Transcendental goods". Reason (magazine), April 1, 2004
 "The Bell Curve Flattened" by Nicholas Lemann, in Slate (magazine) (January 1996)
 "Is the Great Society to Blame? If Not, Why Have Problems Worsened Since '60s?" by Michael Fumento, Investor's Business Daily, June 19, 1992
 "Cracked Bell" by Professor James Heckman in Reason (March 1995)
 "Federal and State Expenditures for AFDC" from the U.S. Department of Health and Human Services website
 "A Brief History of the AFDC Program" from the U.S. Department of Health and Human Services (website)
 "The New Child Care Block Grant, State Funding Choices and Their Implications" by Sharon K. Long & Sandra J. Clark, posted to the Urban Institute website October 1, 1997
 "Women, Children, and Poverty in America" by Prudence Brown, Ford Foundation website
 "Timeline of National Welfare Reform" from PBS.org

External links
Aid to Families with Dependent Children at HHS
The Future of Children, Executive Summary, Center for the Future of Children, The David and Lucile Packard Foundation, at Princeton University website

1935 establishments in the United States
1997 disestablishments in the United States
Former United States Federal assistance programs
United States Department of Health and Human Services
1935 introductions